Ferenc Keserű (27 August 1903 – 16 July 1968) was a Hungarian water polo player who competed at the 1924, 1928, and 1932 Summer Olympics. Born in Budapest, he first competed at the Olympics in 1924. As a member of the Hungarian water polo team he finished seventh. He played all four matches.

He was also a part of the Hungarian water polo team which won the silver medal in 1928 and the gold medal in 1932. At the 1928 Summer Olympics in Amsterdam he played all four matches and scored four goals. Four years later in Los Angeles he played two matches. He died in Budapest.

See also
 Hungary men's Olympic water polo team records and statistics
 List of Olympic champions in men's water polo
 List of Olympic medalists in water polo (men)

References

External links
 

1903 births
1968 deaths
Hungarian male water polo players
Water polo players at the 1924 Summer Olympics
Water polo players at the 1928 Summer Olympics
Water polo players at the 1932 Summer Olympics
Olympic gold medalists for Hungary in water polo
Olympic silver medalists for Hungary in water polo
Medalists at the 1932 Summer Olympics
Medalists at the 1928 Summer Olympics
Water polo players from Budapest
20th-century Hungarian people